Reaper is the electro-industrial project of Vasi Vallis.

History

Reaper was formed by Vasi Vallis shortly before the dissolution of his NamNamBulu project and took on greater prominence following the split. The 'Angst EP' was released in July 2005.  The project played a number of live shows prior to the release of the full-length album 'Hell Starts With An H' in early 2007.  The project toured Europe supporting Combichrist around this time.  At the end of 2007, the EP 'The Devil Is Female' was released, reaching No.1 in the DAC.

Discography

Angst EP (Infacted, 2005)
 Jagd
 Angst
 Daemon
 Totengraeber (Club Edit)
 Angst (Soman Remix)
 Totengraeber (Original edit)
 Daemon (Gudfried Remix by Heimataerde)
 Weltfremd
 Verloren.

Hell Starts With An H CD (Infacted, 2007)
 Intro
 Urnensand
 Das Grauen
 Twisted Trophy Hunter - (with Mark Jackson of VNV Nation)
 Altum Silentium
 Execution of Your Mind
 Weltfremd - (with Suicide Commando/Johan Van Roy)
 Robuste Maschine
 Memento Mori
 Totengraber 07
 Ancient Tragedy
 Tth 2.0 - (with NVMPH)
 Urnensand - (S.A.M. remix)
 Execution of Your Mind - (Modulate remix)
 Urnensand - (Damonie/Painbastard remix)
 Twisted Trophy Hunter - (remix)
 Urnensand - (Schallfaktor remix)

The Devil Is Female EP (Infacted, 2007)
 The Devil Is Female
 X-Junkie
 She Is a Devil and a Whore
 X-Junkie (Club Mix)
 0190
 X-Junkie (Shnarph Remix)
 X-Junkie (Grendel Remix)
 X-Junkie (Distatix Remix)
 X-Junkie (Syncrotek Remix)
 Execution of Your Mind (live)
 X-Junkie (Revolution by Night Remix)

Dirty Cash CDM (Infacted Recordings, 2010)
 Dirty Cash (Feat. Pete Crane)
 Purple Rain (Instrumental)
 Dinero Sucio (Feat. Javi Ssagittar)
 Dirty Cash (Noisuf-X Rmx)
 Purple Rain (Dub Instrumental)
 Robuste Maschine (Mono Tonic)
 Dirty Cash (Rock Me Amadeus)
 Dirty Cash (Syncrotek Rmx)
 Dirty Cash (Eisenfunk Rmx)
 Dirty Cash (Adinferna Rmx)
 Dirty Cash (Skyla Vertex Rmx)

Der Schnitter EP (Infacted Recordings, 2015)
 Der Schnitter (im Club)
 Der Schnitter (mit der Sense)
 Der Schnitter (beim Trinken mit Henrik Iversen)
 Der Schnitter (by Skyla Vertex)
 Der Schnitter (Vasi breaks the rules)
 Der Schnitter (im Club mit der Sense)

Babylon Killed The Music CD (Infacted Recordings, 2016)
 Cracking Skulls
 The Sound Of Ids
 Sledge Hammer
 Farewell
 We Are Reaper
 Sechzehn Punkte Plan
 Neophyte
 Footprint
 Aladin Killed Jfk
 Divide The Sea
 Silver Love

Remixes
 Painbastard - Nervenkrieg (Reaper Mix)
 Extize - Hellektrostar (Reaper Remix)
 Suicide Commando - Menschenfresser (Reaper Remix)
 [SITD] - Rot (Remix by Reaper)
 Nachtmahr - Feuer Frei! (Reaper Remix)
 Suicide Commando - Unterwelt (Reaper Remix)
 Shiv-R - Taste (Reaper Remix)
 SAM - Training (Reaper Remix)
 VNV Nation - Tomorrow never comes (Reaper Remix)

Compilations 
 Endzeit Bunkertracks Act 2 (Alfa Matrix, 2006) | Reaper - Angst
 Nacht der Maschinene Vol. 1 (Infacted Recordings, 2007) | Reaper - She Is A Devil And A Whore (DJ Edit) 
 Extreme Lustlieder Vol. 1 (UpScene, 2008) | Reaper - She Is A Devil And A Whore 
 Empire of Darkness Vol. 2 (Kom4 Medien, 2008) | Reaper - X-Junkie (FSK-18 Mix) 
 Tanzlabor 2010 | Reaper - Robuste Maschine 
 Nacht der Maschinen Vol. 3 (Infacted Recordings, 2011) | Reaper - Dirty Dancing (Studio-X Hard Dance Remix)
 Resistanz Festival Soundtrack 2015 (Digital World Audio, 2015) | Reaper - Drive Thru

References

Electro-industrial music groups